Norton Commander (NC) is a discontinued prototypical orthodox file manager (OFM), written by John Socha and released by Peter Norton Computing (later acquired in 1990 by the Symantec corporation). NC provides a text-based user interface for managing files on top of MS-DOS. It was officially produced between 1986 and 1998. The last MS-DOS version of Norton Commander, 5.51, was released on July 1, 1998.

A related product, Norton Desktop, a graphical shell for MS-DOS and Windows, succeeded Norton Commander. It came in two variants, Norton Desktop for DOS and Norton Desktop for Windows.

Background

John Socha started work on Norton Commander in 1984; at the time, he called it "Visual DOS" or "VDOS".

Norton Commander was easy to use because it had a constant view of two file manipulation objects at once. After starting the program the user sees two panels with file lists. Each panel can be easily configured to show information about the other panel, a directory tree, or a number of other options. At the bottom of the screen, Norton Commander displays a list of commands that are extended on demand by the CTRL and ALT keys. Thus, without heavy use of the mouse (although mouse functionality was integrated around version 3.0), the user is able to perform many file manipulation actions quickly and efficiently. Additionally, it also includes a built-in text file viewer (invoked with F3 key) and text file editor (invoked with F4 key).

Norton Commander was very popular during the DOS era and it has been extensively cloned. For example, the IntelliJ IDE used to include a "Commander" plugin that performed file manipulation using the same shortcut keys as Norton Commander but the plugin is now obsolete.

Long filenames
Windows 95 included a new graphical shell called Windows Explorer and supported long filenames (LFN). Symantec released Norton Commander 5.51 to support long filenames using the standard Windows APIs. In order to preserve LFNs while working in real mode, Norton Commander 5.51 required the use of a terminate-and-stay-resident (TSR) utility. Norton Commander did not have native support for LFNs in real mode and would truncate them.

End of life
According to former Peter Norton Group developer Mark Lawler, after Symantec had acquired Peter Norton Computing, Symantec had speculated Microsoft Windows would be a success, so the key PNC resources had been diverted, while new programmers for Windows platform were hired. Enrique Salem (who eventually became Symantec's CEO) led the development of a Windows shell replacement for Windows File Manager and Program Manager released as Norton Desktop for Windows.

Norton Commander for Windows
Norton Commander for Windows was a Windows 95 variant of the classical DOS file manager.

1.0
Version 1.0 was first released in 1996. It supported both Windows 95 and Windows NT.

This version fully integrated with Windows features such as the Recycle Bin and Quick View. Quick View feature was supported via the included basic Quick View Plus.

Version 1.02 added Windows 98 support.

2.0

Version 2.0 was released in 2000. It supports Windows 2000 and functions under Windows XP, Windows Vista, and Windows 7. Installer included Network Utilities, Norton Commander Scheduler, and the Norton Commander.

Network Utilities allows for viewing devices and systems on network, connecting to remote systems, mapping network drives, network monitoring, and more.

Norton Commander is little changed from previous versions, and includes file compression/de-compression of various formats, network utilities access, disk cleanup, files and folder compare, FTP connection management, and more. 

The last Windows version of Norton Commander was 2.01.

Norton Commander for OS/2
Version 1.0 was released in December 1992. It supports OS/2 2.0 with HPFS or FAT file system.

It does not include the command prompt found in other versions of Norton Commander.

In June 1993, Symantec lowered the price of Norton Commander for OS/2 to $49, and soon ceased sales.

Reception
BYTE in 1989 listed Norton Commander 2.0 for DOS as among the "Distinction" winners of the BYTE Awards, stating that "navigating through a crowded hard disk is a breeze".

Norton Commander-inspired software

There are several programs that follow the style of Norton Commander. Examples are:

ACE Archiver for DOS in the first versions had a NC-inspired interactive interface
Altap Salamander for Windows
BeFAR for BeOS
Commander One for macOS
Demos Commander for Unix and Linux
Directory Opus for Amiga (1990) and Windows (2001)
DOS Command Center (DCC) DOS and Win95 versions
DOS Navigator for DOS
Double Commander for Windows and Linux
FAR Manager for Windows
File Commander for Linux, OS/2 and Windows 
fman for Windows, Mac and Linux
Ghost Commander for Android systems
GNOME Commander for Unix-like systems
HiFile for Windows, Mac and Linux
Krusader for Unix-like systems
Midnight Commander for Unix-like systems (including macOS) and Windows
muCommander for Java platform
Music on Console for Unix-like systems; actually a music player
PowerDesk by Avanquest, of which an evaluation version of Version 4 is included in Microsoft's Windows NT 4.0 Resource Kits
Stereo Shell for DOS
The DOS Controller by Søren Kragh
Total Commander for Windows
Volkov Commander for DOS
WinNC for Windows 10
RAR archive manager used to have Norton Commander-like interface, the last version with that interactive file manager interface look-alike was DOS version 2.50
Xfolders for OS X

References in popular culture 

  Norton Commander is a song released by the Montreal indie group, Men I Trust. While the song contains no literal references to the Norton Commander file manager, it is speculated that the song's subject matter of comfort and familiarity relate to the familiarity and reliability of the software.

See also
Comparison of file managers

References

External links
The History of Development of Norton Commander (Softpanorama)
21st Century Nostalgia A Tribute to Norton Commander 5.0
Norton Desktop for Windows 1.0 A graphical review in the GUI Gallery

Orthodox file managers
DOS software
OS/2 software
Utilities for Windows
Commander
Gen Digital software
Proprietary software
Discontinued software
1986 software